Albizia obbiadensis is a species of plant in the family Fabaceae. It is found only in Somalia.

References

obbiadensis
Endemic flora of Somalia
Trees of Africa
Vulnerable flora of Africa
Taxonomy articles created by Polbot